North Lake (Nova Scotia)  is a lake of Antigonish County, Nova Scotia, Canada. It is fed by the North Lake stream and exits into George's Bay in the Atlantic Ocean.

See also
List of lakes in Nova Scotia

References

 National Resources Canada

Lakes of Nova Scotia